This is a list of stations of the Kolkata Suburban Railway, a suburban rail system serving the Kolkata Metropolitan Region in West Bengal, India.

The Kolkata Suburban Railway was opened in 1854. The system is operated by Eastern Railway and South Eastern Railway zone. Each route contains "slow" and "fast" tracks. "Slow" tracks are dedicated tracks for suburban trains, while "fast" tracks are shared with long-distance trains operated by Indian Railways. Some railway stations on the network serve both suburban as well as long-distance trains.

The Kolkata Suburban Railway comprises five major lines – Eastern line, South Eastern line, Circular line, South lines and Chord link line. Each of these corridors may consist of additional lines that may intersect with each other. The system uses rolling stock of broad gauge and consists of largely at-grade and short segments of elevated and embankment lines. The railway system is open from about 0400 to 0100 and has an average daily ridership of 2-3 million commuters.

Stations

Notes

References

External links
Kolkata Suburban stations on Eastern Railway
Kolkata Suburban stations on South Eastern Railway

Kolkata Suburban Railway

Kolkata
Suburban Railway Stations
Kolkata Sururban Railway Stations